The 2021 Cheltenham Borough Council elections took place on 6 May 2021 to elect members of Cheltenham Borough Council in Gloucestershire, England. Half of the council was up for election, and the Liberal Democrats remained in overall control of the council.

These seats were due to be contested in 2020, but were delayed by one year due to the COVID-19 pandemic.

Results

Council composition
Before the election, the composition of the council was:

After the election, the composition of the council was:

PAB - People Against Bureaucracy

Ward results
Incumbent councillors are denoted by an asterisk (*)

All Saints

Battledown

Benhall & The Reddings

Charlton Kings

Charlton Park

College

Hesters Way

Lansdown

Leckhampton

Oakley

Park

Pittville

Prestbury

Springbank

St. Mark's

St. Paul's

St. Peter's

Swindon Village

Up Hatherley

Warden Hill

References

Cheltenham
2021
2020s in Gloucestershire